Alopecuroceras is a genus of flies in the family Stratiomyidae.

Species
Alopecuroceras atripluma James, 1960
Alopecuroceras coloratum Lindner, 1936

References

Stratiomyidae
Brachycera genera
Taxa named by Erwin Lindner
Diptera of Africa